Division Street may refer to:

Division Street (Chicago)
Division Street (Manhattan), New York
Division Street (Spokane, Washington)
Division Street, Sheffield, England

See also
Division Street Bridge (Rhode Island)
Division Street Bridge (Spokane, Washington)